Wiremu Rika Heke (3 October 1894 – 30 November 1989) was a New Zealand rugby union player. A loose forward, Heke represented North Auckland at a provincial level, and was a member of the New Zealand national side, the All Blacks, on their 1929 tour of Australia. He played six matches for the All Blacks including three internationals.

Following the death of Beethoven Algar two days before his own death, Heke briefly held the distinction of being the oldest living All Black.

References

1894 births
1989 deaths
People from the Northland Region
New Zealand rugby union players
New Zealand international rugby union players
Northland rugby union players
Rugby union flankers
Māori All Blacks players
Rugby union players from Rotorua